St Peter and St Paul is a Church of England parish church in Chingford, London. The church is a Grade II* listed building.

History
It was built in 1844 by the architect Lewis Vulliamy, and the eastern parts were added in 1903 by Sir Arthur Blomfield. It was paid for with £5,000 of his own money by Robert Boothby Heathcote, the then rector of All Saints, Chingford, who was concerned about the poor condition of that church.

On 28 June 1954, the church was designated a Grade II* listed building.

Present day
The parish of Chingford is in the Archdeaconry of West Ham of the Diocese of Chelmsford. The parish worships in the Anglo-Catholic tradition of the Church of England.

Notable clergy

 Maxwell Hutchinson, architect, serves as parish deacon since 2016

Gallery

References

Peter
Grade II* listed churches in London
Lewis Vulliamy buildings
Arthur Blomfield church buildings
Chingford
Churches completed in 1844
19th-century Church of England church buildings
Grade II* listed buildings in the London Borough of Waltham Forest
Anglo-Catholic church buildings in London
1844 establishments in England